The 2002 NCAA Division I Women's Golf Championships were contested at the 21st annual NCAA-sanctioned golf tournament to determine the individual and team national champions of women's Division I collegiate golf in the United States.

The tournament was held at the Washington National Golf Club in Auburn, Washington.

Duke won the team championship, the Blue Devils' second.

Virada Nirapathpongporn, also from Duke, won the individual title.

Individual results

Individual champion
 Virada Nirapathpongporn, Duke (279, −5)

Team leaderboard

 DC = Defending champion
 Debut appearance

References

NCAA Women's Golf Championship
Golf in Washington (state)
NCAA Women's Golf Championship
NCAA Women's Golf Championship
NCAA Women's Golf Championship